Thomas Fitzherbert (23 August 1869 – 20 September 1937) was an English cricketer. He played in one first-class match for Trinidad and Tobago in 1903/04.

See also
 List of Trinidadian representative cricketers

References

External links
 

1869 births
1937 deaths
English cricketers
Trinidad and Tobago cricketers
Sportspeople from Stafford